Kakei (嘉慶) was a Japanese era name (年号, nengō, lit. year name) of the Northern Court during the Era of Northern and Southern Courts after Shitoku and before Kōō. This period spanned the years from August 1387 to February 1389.

Nanboku-chō overview
   
During the Meiji period, an Imperial decree dated March 3, 1911 established that the legitimate reigning monarchs of this period were the direct descendants of Emperor Go-Daigo through Emperor Go-Murakami, whose  had been established in exile in Yoshino, near Nara.

Until the end of the Edo period, the militarily superior pretender-Emperors supported by the Ashikaga shogunate had been mistakenly incorporated in Imperial chronologies despite the undisputed fact that the Imperial Regalia were not in their possession.

This illegitimate  had been established in Kyoto by Ashikaga Takauji.

Change of era
 1387, also called : The new era name was created to mark an event or series of events. The previous era ended and the new one commenced in Shitoku 4.

In this time frame, Genchū (1384–1393) was the Southern Court equivalent nengō.

Events of the Kakei era
 1387 (Kakei 1, 1st month): Nijō Yoshimoto is removed from his powerful position as sesshō and daijō daijin.
 1387 (Kakei 1, 2nd month): Konoe Kanetsugu is named sesshō.
 1387-89 (Kakei 1–3): Dissension develops in Toki family of Mino.
 1388 (Kakei 2, 3rd month): The sesshō Konoe Kanetsugu dies at age 29; and Yoshimoto re-assumes this role in the following month.
 1388 (Kakei 2, 6th month): Yoshitomo dies at age 69; and his son Nijō Morotsugu succeeds him with the title of kampaku.
 1389 -- Yoshimitsu pacifies Kyūshū and distributes lands; Yoshimitsu opposed by Kamakura kanrei Ashikaga Ujimitsu.

Notes

References
 Ackroyd, Joyce. (1982) Lessons from History: The Tokushi Yoron. Brisbane: University of Queensland Press. 
 Mehl, Margaret. (1997). History and the State in Nineteenth-Century Japan. New York: St Martin's Press. ; OCLC 419870136
 Nussbaum, Louis Frédéric and Käthe Roth. (2005). Japan Encyclopedia. Cambridge: Harvard University Press. ; OCLC 48943301
 Thomas, Julia Adeney. (2001). Reconfiguring Modernity: Concepts of Nature in Japanese Political Ideology. Berkeley: University of California Press. ; 
 Titsingh, Isaac. (1834). Nihon Odai Ichiran; ou,  Annales des empereurs du Japon.  Paris: Royal Asiatic Society, Oriental Translation Fund of Great Britain and Ireland. OCLC 5850691

External links
 National Diet Library, "The Japanese Calendar" -- historical overview plus illustrative images from library's collection

Japanese eras
1380s in Japan